Anne Hummert (née Schumacher) (January 19, 1905 – July 5, 1996) was the leading creator of daytime radio serials or soap opera dramas during the 1930s and 1940s, responsible for more than three dozen series.

Biography
She was born in Baltimore, Maryland, one of four children. Little is known about her parents or her childhood:  some sources say her father Frederick was a police lieutenant; census documents say he was a steamfitter and contractor, and still other sources say he was an engineer.   After attending Towson High School, she attended Goucher College, where she majored in history, graduating Phi Beta Kappa and magna cum laude in 1925.  While at Goucher she also worked as a college correspondent for The Baltimore Sun.  She then took a job with the Paris precursor of the International Herald Tribune. It was in France that she married reporter John Ashenhurst, a former member of The Baltimore Suns editorial staff, in July 1926. The couple had one son, but the marriage was troubled. They moved back to the United States, and ultimately divorced.  Anne Ashenhurst moved to Chicago, where she sought work as a journalist, but was unable to find a job.  She was told of an opening at an advertising agency, and in 1930, she was hired as a copywriter and assistant to advertising executive E. Frank Hummert. At the Blackett-Sample-Hummert agency, she rose in the ranks and became a full partner in 1933, earning $100,000 a year. Radio historian Jim Cox noted that when the two teamed to create daytime radio serials, they:

After their first major success, Just Plain Bill, they followed with Ma Perkins, Skippy, Backstage Wife and Young Widder Brown.  Their professional collaboration led to a personal relationship that neither had expected: Frank Hummert was a widower, after the death of his wife, Adeline, and he was twenty years older than his assistant.  As for Anne, she was still getting over her divorce from her husband John and was not expecting to remarry.  Frank and Anne got married in 1935, and friends would later describe their marriage as "one of the great love matches". Following their marriage, Frank and Anne Hummert moved to New York where they launched their company, Air Features, a radio production house. The Hummerts produced many radio drama series, including Amanda of Honeymoon Hill, Front Page Farrell, John's Other Wife, Little Orphan Annie, Judy and Jane, Mr. Chameleon, Mr. Keen, Tracer of Lost Persons and Our Gal Sunday. They soon had as many as 18 separate 15-minute serials airing for a total of 90 episodes a week. They also produced The American Album of Familiar Music.

From their estate in Greenwich, Connecticut, Anne Hummert delivered a large weekly word count, outlining all of the plot twists for all of her programs. The Hummerts farmed out the writing to scripters, known as "dialoguers", who embellished her synopses into complete scripts for Stella Dallas, Young Widder Brown and other soap operas.

Actress Mary Jane Higby observed, "Unquestionably, they had a profound influence on the whole literature of soap opera. They, more than anyone else, determined the shape it took." According to Jim Cox, by the 1940s, the Hummerts controlled four-and-a-half hours of the national weekday broadcast schedule. Their programs brought in more than five million letters a year. By 1939, the Hummert's programs were responsible for more than half the advertising revenues generated by daytime radio. They also did primetime musical shows, such as Waltz Time.

The Hummerts each had an annual income of $100,000. Frank Hummert died at 76 in 1966.  Anne Hummert was a multimillionaire when she died July 5, 1996, in her Fifth Avenue apartment at the age of 91.

See also
List of radio soaps

References

Cox, Jim (2003). Frank and Anne Hummert's Radio Factory: The Programs and Personalities of Broadcasting's Most Prolific Producers. McFarland Publishing. 
Taves, Isabella (1943). Successful Women and How They Attained Success. New York: P. Dutton & Co.

External links
The Paley Center for Media: Anne Hummert
Meyers, Cynthia Barbara (2005). Admen and the Shaping of American Commercial Broadcasting, 1926-50
Anne and Frank Hummert Scripts at the University of Wyoming - American Heritage Center

American soap opera writers
1905 births
1996 deaths
Goucher College alumni
20th-century American screenwriters